Semantic heterogeneity is when database schema or datasets for the same domain are developed by independent parties, resulting in differences in meaning and interpretation of data values. Beyond structured data, the problem of semantic heterogeneity is compounded due to the flexibility of semi-structured data and various tagging methods applied to documents or unstructured data. Semantic heterogeneity is one of the more important sources of differences in heterogeneous datasets.

Yet, for multiple data sources to interoperate with one another, it is essential to reconcile these semantic differences. Decomposing the various sources of semantic heterogeneities provides a basis for understanding how to map and transform data to overcome these differences.

Classification 

One of the first known classification schemes applied to data semantics is from William Kent more than two decades ago. Kent's approach dealt more with structural mapping issues than differences in meaning, which he pointed to data dictionaries as potentially solving.

One of the most comprehensive classifications is from Pluempitiwiriyawej and Hammer, "Classification Scheme for Semantic and Schematic Heterogeneities in XML Data Sources". They classify heterogeneities into three broad classes:

 Structural conflicts arise when the schema of the sources representing related or overlapping data exhibit discrepancies. Structural conflicts can be detected when comparing the underlying schema. The class of structural conflicts includes generalization conflicts, aggregation conflicts, internal path discrepancy, missing items, element ordering, constraint and type mismatch, and naming conflicts between the element types and attribute names.
 Domain conflicts arise when the semantics of the data sources that will be integrated exhibit discrepancies. Domain conflicts can be detected by looking at the information contained in the schema and using knowledge about the underlying data domains. The class of domain conflicts includes schematic discrepancy, scale or unit, precision, and data representation conflicts.
 Data conflicts refer to discrepancies among similar or related data values across multiple sources. Data conflicts can only be detected by comparing the underlying sources. The class of data conflicts includes ID-value, missing data, incorrect spelling, and naming conflicts between the element contents and the attribute values.

Moreover, mismatches or conflicts can occur between set elements (a "population" mismatch) or attributes (a "description" mismatch).

Michael Bergman expanded upon this schema by adding a fourth major explicit category of language, and also added some examples of each kind of semantic heterogeneity, resulting in about 40 distinct potential categories 
. This table shows the combined 40 possible sources of semantic heterogeneities across sources:

A different approach toward classifying semantics and integration approaches is taken by Sheth et al. Under their concept, they split semantics into three forms: implicit, formal and powerful. Implicit semantics are what is either largely present or can easily be extracted; formal languages, though relatively scarce, occur in the form of ontologies or other description logics; and powerful (soft) semantics are fuzzy and not limited to rigid set-based assignments. Sheth et al.'s main point is that first-order logic (FOL) or description logic is inadequate alone to properly capture the needed semantics.

Relevant applications 

Besides data interoperability, relevant areas in information technology that depend on reconciling semantic heterogeneities include data mapping, semantic integration, and enterprise information integration, among many others. From the conceptual to actual data, there are differences in perspective, vocabularies, measures and conventions once any two data sources are brought together. Explicit attention to these semantic heterogeneities is one means to get the information to integrate or interoperate.

A mere twenty years ago, information technology systems expressed and stored data in a multitude of formats and systems. The Internet and Web protocols have done much to overcome these sources of differences. While there is a large number of categories of semantic heterogeneity, these categories are also patterned and can be anticipated and corrected. These patterned sources inform what kind of work must be done to overcome semantic differences where they still reside.

See also
 Data integration
 Data mapping
 Enterprise information integration
 Heterogeneous database system
 Interoperability
 Ontology-based data integration
 Schema matching
 Semantic integration
 Semantic matching
 Semantics

References

Further reading
 Classification of semantic heterogeneity

Data management
Interoperability
Knowledge management
Semantics